O3 is the fourth album by Son of Dave and was released on 7 April 2008. It includes a cover of "Low Rider" by War and a reworking of Muddy Waters' "I Just Wanna Make Love to You" as "I Just Wanna Get High with You".

Track listing

Singles
"Old Times Were Good Times" with the B-side "So Good, So Wrong" released in March 2008.

References

External links
Review by Charlie Gillett in The Observer
Review by Steve Hands at musicOMH

2008 albums
Son of Dave albums